Darren Kirk (born 23 July 1968) is a British former professional tennis player.

Kirk, who comes from Lincolnshire, reached a best singles ranking of 650 and made a main draw appearance at the 1988 Bristol Open, as well as in qualifiers for Wimbledon. He was ranked as high as 261 in the world for doubles and won an ATP Challenger doubles title in Bristol in 1992, beating a pairing of Leander Paes/Kevin Ullyett en route.

ATP Challenger titles

Doubles: (1)

References

External links
 
 

1968 births
Living people
British male tennis players
English male tennis players
Tennis people from Lincolnshire